A Clifford semigroup (sometimes also called "inverse Clifford semigroup") is a completely regular inverse semigroup.
It is an inverse semigroup with
. Examples of Clifford semigroups are groups and commutative inverse semigroups.

In a Clifford semigroup, .

References

Algebraic structures
Semigroup theory